Bosnia and Herzegovina competed at the 2020 Summer Olympics in Tokyo. Originally scheduled to take place from 24 July to 9 August 2020, the Games were postponed to 23 July to 8 August 2021, because of the COVID-19 pandemic. It was the nation's eighth consecutive appearance at the Summer Olympics.

These were the most successful Olympic Games for Bosnia and Herzegovina thus far, who for the first time ever had more than one athlete place among the 10 best in their categories, with Nedžad Husić finishing 5th, Amel Tuka finishing 6th, and Larisa Cerić finishing 9th. Also close to finishing in the top 10 was Mesud Pezer, who placed 11th.

Competitors
The following is the list of number of competitors in the Games.

Athletics

Bosnian athletes further achieved the entry standards, either by qualifying time or by world ranking, in the following track and field events (up to a maximum of 3 athletes in each event):

Track & road events

Field events

Judo

Bosnia and Herzegovina entered one female judoka into the Olympic tournament based on the International Judo Federation Olympics Individual Ranking.

Shooting

Bosnia and Herzegovina received an invitation from the ISSF to send a female air rifle shooter to the Olympics, based on her minimum qualifying score (MQS) attained on or before June 5, 2021.

Swimming

Bosnian swimmers further achieved qualifying standards in the following events (up to a maximum of 2 swimmers in each event at the Olympic Qualifying Time (OQT), and potentially 1 at the Olympic Selection Time (OST)):

Taekwondo

Bosnia and Herzegovina entered one athlete into the taekwondo competition at the Games for the first time since 2004. Nedžad Husić secured a spot in the men's lightweight category (68 kg) with a top two finish at the 2021 European Qualification Tournament in Sofia, Bulgaria.

See also 
 Bosnia and Herzegovina at the 2020 Summer Paralympics

References

External links 

Nations at the 2020 Summer Olympics
2020
2021 in Bosnia and Herzegovina sport